Đỗ Cảnh Thạc (912–967), formally Duke Cảnh (景公), was a warlord of Vietnam during the Period of the 12 Warlords.

Đỗ Cảnh Thạc was a Chinese from Guangling (in mordern Yangzhou, Jiangsu Province). In 905, he was sent to put down the rebellion of Đường, Nguyễn together with Ngô Xương Văn and Dương Cát Lợi. Ngô Xương Văn was the second son of the former ruler Ngô Quyền. When their troops reached Từ Liêm, Văn persuaded his two colleagues to turn their armies back, and dethroned the usurper Dương Tam Kha.

After Ngô Xương Văn's death, Thạc occupied Đỗ Động Giang (mordern Thanh Oai District, Hanoi), and titled himself Đỗ Cảnh Công (杜景公). Later, he was defeated by Đinh Bộ Lĩnh.

References

912 births
967 deaths
10th-century Vietnamese people
People from Hanoi
Vietnamese people of Chinese descent
Anarchy of the 12 Warlords